Bahalia is a village located in Contai III Block in the Purba Medinipur district in the state of West Bengal, India.

References 

Villages in Purba Medinipur district